John Thomas Sweeney (8 August 1863 – 2 September 1947) was an Australian politician from New South Wales.

Born at Campbelltown to farmer Michael Sweeney and Mary Ann, née Rudd, he was a miner at Bulli. In 1893 he married Virginia Mary Grace Standen, with whom he had seven children. From 1916 to 1931 he was secretary of the Southern District Miners' Federation, and he served on the central executive of the Labor Party from 1923 to 1924.

He was elected to the New South Wales Legislative Assembly at the 1933 Bulli by-election, serving as the member for Bulli until his retirement in 1947. He did not hold any party or political office.

References

 

1863 births
1947 deaths
Members of the New South Wales Legislative Assembly
Australian Labor Party members of the Parliament of New South Wales